Memorabilia